Nuclear fission splits a heavy nucleus such as uranium or plutonium into two lighter nuclei, which are called fission products. Yield refers to the fraction of a fission product produced per fission.

Yield can be broken down by:
 Individual isotope
 Chemical element spanning several isotopes of different mass number but same atomic number.
 Nuclei of a given mass number regardless of atomic number. Known as "chain yield" because it represents a decay chain of beta decay.

Isotope and element yields will change as the fission products undergo beta decay, while chain yields do not change after completion of neutron emission by a few neutron-rich initial fission products (delayed neutrons), with half-life measured in seconds.

A few isotopes can be produced directly by fission, but not by beta decay because the would-be precursor with atomic number one greater is stable and does not decay. Chain yields do not account for these "shadowed" isotopes; however, they have very low yields (less than a millionth as much as common fission products) because they are far less neutron-rich than the original heavy nuclei.

Yield is usually stated as percentage per fission, so that the total yield percentages sum to 200%. Less often, it is stated as percentage of all fission products, so that the percentages sum to 100%. Ternary fission, about 0.2–0.4% of fissions, also produces a third light nucleus such as helium-4 (90%) or tritium (7%).

Mass vs. yield curve 

If a graph of the mass or mole yield of fission products against the atomic number of the fragments is drawn then it has two peaks, one in the area zirconium through to palladium and one at xenon through to neodymium. This is because the fission event causes the nucleus to split in an asymmetric manner, as nuclei closer to magic numbers are more stable.

Yield vs. Z - This is a typical distribution for the fission of uranium. Note that in the calculations used to make this graph the activation of fission products was ignored and the fission was assumed to occur in a single moment rather than a length of time. In this bar chart results are shown for different cooling times (time after fission).

Because of the stability of nuclei with even numbers of protons and/or neutrons the curve of yield against element is not a smooth curve. It tends to alternate.

In general, the higher the energy of the state that undergoes nuclear fission, the more likely a symmetric fission is, hence as the neutron energy increases and/or the energy of the fissile atom increases, the valley between the two peaks becomes more shallow; for instance, the curve of yield against mass for Pu-239 has a more shallow valley than that observed for U-235, when the neutrons are thermal neutrons. The curves for the fission of the later actinides tend to make even more shallow valleys. In extreme cases such as 259Fm, only one peak is seen.

Yield is usually expressed relative to number of fissioning nuclei, not the number of fission product nuclei, that is, yields should sum to 200%.

The yields in the table sum to only 45.5522%, including 34.8401% which have half-lives greater than one year:

The remainder and the unlisted 54.4478% decay with half-lives less than one year into nonradioactive nuclei.

This is before accounting for the effects of any subsequent neutron capture; e.g.:
 135Xe capturing a neutron and becoming nearly stable 136Xe, rather than decaying to 135Cs which is radioactive with a half-life of 2.3 million years
 Nonradioactive 133Cs capturing a neutron and becoming 134Cs, which is radioactive with a half-life of 2 years
 Many of the fission products with mass 147 or greater such as 147Pm, 149Sm, 151Sm, and 155Eu have significant cross sections for neutron capture, so that one heavy fission product atom can undergo multiple successive neutron captures.

Besides fission products, the other types of radioactive products are

 plutonium containing 238Pu, 239Pu, 240Pu, 241Pu, and 242Pu,
 minor actinides including 237Np, 241Am, 243Am, curium isotopes, and perhaps californium
 reprocessed uranium containing 236U and other isotopes
 tritium
 activation products of neutron capture by the reactor or bomb structure or the environment

Fission products from U-235

Cumulative fission yields
Cumulative fission yields give the amounts of nuclides produced either directly in the fission or by decay of other nuclides.

Ordered by mass number
Decays, even if lengthy, are given down to the stable nuclide.

Decays with half lives longer than a century are marked with a single asterisk, while decays with a half life longer than a hundred million  years are marked with two asterisks.

Half lives, decay modes, and branching fractions

Ordered by thermal neutron absorption cross section

References

External links
 HANDBOOK OF NUCLEAR DATA FOR SAFEGUARDS: DATABASE EXTENSIONS, AUGUST 2008
  The Live Chart of Nuclides - IAEA  Color-map of yields, and detailed data by click on a nuclide.

Nuclear fission
Nuclear chemistry